Kenneth Douglas McKellar (January 29, 1869October 25, 1957) was an American politician from Tennessee who served as a United States Representative from 1911 until 1917 and as a United States Senator from 1917 until 1953. A Democrat, he served longer in both houses of Congress than anyone else in Tennessee history.

Only a few other congressmen in American history have served longer in both houses.

Early life and career
McKellar was a native of Dallas County, Alabama. He graduated from the University of Alabama in 1891 and its law school in 1892.

He moved to Memphis, Tennessee and is related to Henry Nickey, an MUS Basketball star, and was admitted to the state bar the same year. McKellar joined the Democratic Party, which dominated the politics of West Tennessee, where plantations were historically and economically important. He was first elected to the House in a special election in November 1911 to succeed George W. Gordon in Tennessee's 10th congressional district, which included Memphis. He won the seat in his own right in 1912 and was reelected in 1914, serving until his election to the United States Senate.

He was a presidential elector in 1904.

United States Senate
McKellar ran for the Senate in 1916, defeating incumbent Senator Luke Lea in the Democratic primary and winning the general election against former Republican Governor Ben W. Hooper. He was reelected to the Senate in 1922 (defeating former Senator Newell Sanders), 1928 (defeating former U.S. Assistant Attorney General James Alexander Fowler), 1934 (again defeating Ben Hooper), 1940 (against Howard Baker, Sr., father of future Senator Howard Baker), and 1946 when he defeated William B. Ladd.

McKellar was considered a moderate progressive in his early days in the Senate, and he supported many of President Woodrow Wilson's reform initiatives as well as ratification of the Treaty of Versailles. During President Franklin D. Roosevelt's administration, McKellar staunchly supported the New Deal, especially the creation of the Tennessee Valley Authority (TVA), to provide flood control and generate hydropower for rural electrification in the Tennessee Valley. McKellar was  close ally of Memphis Democratic political boss E. H. Crump.

Kenneth McKellar was a crusader for free trade; he supported the repeal of the Smoot-Hawley Tariff after 1930. Despite his early support for the policies of Franklin D. Roosevelt (FDR), McKellar became more conservative in his political stances. He opposed several of the administration's appointments. He had a prolonged feud with FDR's appointee to head the TVA, David E. Lilienthal.

As ranking member of the Appropriations Committee McKellar, who was an avid supporter of property rights, successfully forced the TVA to properly reimburse landowners whose property was taken over by the TVA for such purposes as dam building and creation of lakes or reservoirs. Prior to McKellar's threats to withhold Federal appropriations for the purchase of uranium early in World War II, the TVA was commonly offering to give landholders "pennies on the dollar" for their properties. As head of the Appropriations Committee, McKellar knew about the appropriations needed for the Manhattan Project to build an atomic bomb. He was often called upon to "keep the secret" of the Manhattan Project by mingling funds for the bomb project with other projects, or through carefully planned (secret) War Projects Funding. As the Tennessee Valley Authority was centered in Tennessee, his home state, McKellar reacted to what he thought was harsh TVA treatment of his constituents as a personal affront by Lilienthal.

McKellar's threat to withhold funding for purchases of uranium had a much deeper meaning, though.  Lilienthal was also closely associated with the Manhattan Project's work to electromagnetically enrich uranium, coincidentally at the facility later known as Y-12. Ernest Lawrence's "electromagnetic" enrichment of uranium at Oak Ridge would eventually use the electricity created by the TVA to enrich the uranium used in the atomic bomb dropped on Hiroshima. By threatening to withhold funding for the purchase of uranium, McKellar was demonstrating to Lilienthal that the politician, as ranking member and Acting Chairman of the Appropriations Committee, held the power. He forced Lilienthal to have the TVA pay fair market value for land it appropriated.

McKellar twice served as President pro tempore of the United States Senate. Beginning in 1945, he was the first to hold the position under the seniority system that has prevailed since of reserving it for the majority party. When Harry Truman became president in April 1945, upon FDR's death, the vice presidency became vacant. (The mechanism for filling intra-term vacancies had not yet been created by the 25th Amendment.) McKellar became the permanent Presiding Officer of the United States Senate.

Also, as the President pro tempore of the Senate had, prior to 1886, been second in the presidential line of succession, behind only the vice president, Truman viewed McKellar as the logical wartime replacement for himself, and asked McKellar to attend all Cabinet meetings. In 1947 Truman successfully lobbied Congress to pass a new Presidential Succession Act, restoring both the Speaker of the House and the President pro tempore of the Senate to the succession ahead of Cabinet secretaries. By the time the law came into effect, McKellar was no longer in the position of President pro tempore, as the Republicans had gained the majority in the 80th Congress. Truman vetoed the Taft-Hartley Act in 1947 to restrict labor unions, which McKellar had favored. Truman selected Alben Barkley of Kentucky as his running mate in the 1948 presidential election. When Democrats regained control of the Senate following the 1948 elections, McKellar again became President pro tempore. He was second in line for the presidency (behind the Speaker of the House) from January 3, 1949 until January 20, 1949, when Alben Barkley took office as Vice President of the United States.

McKellar also served as chairman of the Civil Service Committee, Post Office and Road Committee, and, most notably, the powerful Appropriations Committee from 1945–1947, and again from 1949–1953.

Longevity
McKellar is the only Tennessee senator to have completed more than three full terms. Except for McKellar, Tennessee has generally not joined in the Southern tradition of reelecting senators for protracted periods of service.

Before the era of popular election of U.S. Senators, Senator William B. Bate was elected to a fourth term by the Tennessee General Assembly, but he died five days into this term, while Senator Isham G. Harris also died early in his fourth term. Senator Joseph Anderson was elected by the General Assembly to three full terms plus the balance of the term of William Blount, who had been expelled from the Senate.

1952 election

In 1952 McKellar stood for a seventh term (the first Senator to do so), despite being 83. He was opposed for renomination by Middle Tennessee Congressman Albert Gore. McKellar's reelection slogan was "Thinking Feller? Vote McKellar", which Gore countered with "Think Some More – Vote for Gore." Gore defeated McKellar for the Democratic nomination in August in what was widely regarded as something of an upset. At this point in Tennessee history, the Democratic nomination for statewide office was still "tantamount to election." Most African Americans had been disenfranchised by discriminatory laws and practices, resulting in the Republican Party being active chiefly in East Tennessee. This had been the case since the Civil War. Gore served three full terms in the Senate.

McKellar's defeat was part of a statewide trend of change in 1952. That year incumbent governor of Tennessee Gordon Browning was defeated by Frank G. Clement. Browning, who had served a total of three terms as governor, the last two successive, had also at one point been a close ally of Crump's but had since broken ranks with him. As Clement and Gore were both considerably younger and regarded as more progressive than their predecessors, some historians cite the 1952 elections as an indication that Tennessee entered into the "New South" era of Southern politics earlier than most of the other Southern states.

Legacy
McKellar wrote a book about his Tennessee predecessors in the Senate called Tennessee Senators as Seen by One of Their Successors (1942). In recent years it has been updated by one of his successors, former Senate Majority Leader Dr. Bill Frist.

Lake McKellar, bordering the Memphis President's Island industrial area along the Mississippi River and McKellar-Sipes Regional Airport (originally "McKellar Field") in Jackson, Tennessee ("MKL") are both named in his honor.

McKellar died on October 25, 1957. He is interred at Elmwood Cemetery in Memphis, Tennessee.

Representation in other media
Some have speculated that Senator McKellar was the inspiration for the character South Carolina Senator Seabright Cooley in Allen Drury's novel Advise and Consent.

McKellar was portrayed by actor/country singer Ed Bruce in the film Public Enemies (2009) and Michael O'Neill in the film J. Edgar (2011).

References

External links
 

1869 births
1957 deaths
Presidents pro tempore of the United States Senate
Politicians from Memphis, Tennessee
Democratic Party United States senators from Tennessee
Democratic Party members of the United States House of Representatives from Tennessee
People from Dallas County, Alabama
1904 United States presidential electors